Louisville is a city in Pottawatomie County, Kansas, United States.  As of the 2020 census, the population of the city was 131.

History
Founded in 1857 by Robert Wilson as Rock Post.  The area was once part of the Potawatomi Hunting grounds and a large majority of the settlers were either associated with the Pottawatomie Indian Reservation or commerce on the Oregon Trail.  Louisville was named for Robert Wilson's son, Louis, and for Louis Vieux, a successful businessman in the area.  The town was a contender for county seat of Pottawatomie County but lost to St. George in 1861 and Westmoreland in 1882.

On November 8, 1875, Louisville was struck by an earthquake.  In 1882, with the county seat in Westmoreland and the Union Pacific Railroad built through Wamego, the town's population swiftly declined.

Louis Vieux
Louis Vieux Sr. was a prominent citizen of Louisville who operated a trail crossing across the Vermillion River.  He was born in 1809 in Wisconsin to Angelique Roy, a Potawatomi woman, and Jacques Vieux, a Canadian-French trader. Vieux and his wife, Sha-Note, moved first to Cedar Bluffs, Iowa in 1832 until moving to Indianola, Kansas (northwest of Topeka along Soldier Creek) in 1846.  Sha-Note died in 1857 and Vieux moved to the Vermillion River near present-day Louisville.  Vieux began his trail crossing business and worked as a caller for the U.S. Government working the pay station in St. Mary's and he also served on the tribal council and made trips to Washington, D.C. on behalf of the Pottawatomies.  Vieux also signed the treaty that split the Pottawatomies into two separate tribes-the Prairie Band and Citizen Potawatomi Nation.  Vieux died in 1872 and left behind a 200-page will leaving half the town of Louisville, all of Belvue and other personal property to his wife and children.

Oregon Trail crossing

About three miles east of Louisville was the Vermillion Crossing of the Oregon Trail operated by Louis Vieux.  Vieux is buried in the Vieux Family Cemetery on top of a hill.  Nearby, on the banks of the river, is a cholera cemetery from 1849, which is estimated to contain at least fifty graves, although only two stones — both native sandstones — remain.  The Louis Vieux Elm Tree is across the river and is estimated to be over 300 years old.  The tree had been afflicted with Dutch elm disease, a lightning strike and vandalism and efforts were taken to protect and shelter the tree's stump.  In August 2011, the stump was destroyed by fire. Near the tree are the graves of seven unknown soldiers.

Geography
Louisville is located at  (39.251,-96.314), between Wamego and Westmoreland on K-99.

Demographics

Louisville is part of the Manhattan, Kansas Metropolitan Statistical Area.

2010 census
As of the census of 2010, there were 188 people, 78 households, and 39 families residing in the city. The racial makeup of the city was 92.0% White, 1.1% Native American, 4.3% from other races, and 2.7% from two or more races. Hispanic or Latino of any race were 5.9% of the population.

There were 78 households, of which 29.5% had children under the age of 18 living with them, 38.5% were married couples living together, 10.3% had a female householder with no husband present, 1.3% had a male householder with no wife present, and 50.0% were non-families. 26.9% of all households were made up of individuals, and 10.2% had someone living alone who was 65 years of age or older. The average household size was 2.41 and the average family size was 3.18.

The median age in the city was 34.5 years. 22.9% of residents were under the age of 18; 11.7% were between the ages of 18 and 24; 28.7% were from 25 to 44; 26.1% were from 45 to 64; and 10.6% were 65 years of age or older. The gender makeup of the city was 51.1% male and 48.9% female.

2000 census
As of the census of 2000, there were 209 people, 77 households, and 56 families residing in the city. The racial makeup of the city was 98.56% White, 0.48% from other races, and 0.96% from two or more races. Hispanic or Latino of any race were 1.44% of the population.

There were 77 households, out of which 37.7% had children under the age of 18 living with them, 54.5% were married couples living together, 18.2% had a female householder with no husband present, and 26.0% were non-families. 19.5% of all households were made up of individuals, and 7.8% had someone living alone who was 65 years of age or older. The average household size was 2.71 and the average family size was 3.09.

In the city, the population was spread out, with 29.2% under the age of 18, 8.1% from 18 to 24, 30.1% from 25 to 44, 20.1% from 45 to 64, and 12.4% who were 65 years of age or older. The median age was 35 years. For every 100 females, there were 95.3 males. For every 100 females age 18 and over, there were 97.3 males.

The median income for a household in the city was $35,568, and the median income for a family was $37,045. Males had a median income of $26,250 versus $18,472 for females. The per capita income for the city was $15,741. About 8.9% of families and 12.2% of the population were below the poverty line, including 24.5% of those under the age of eighteen and none of those 65 or over.

Education
The community is served by Wamego USD 320 public school district.

References

Further reading

External links
 Louisville - Directory of Public Officials
 Louis Vieux History
 Pictures and a brief history of the Elm Tree
 Louisville city map, KDOT

Cities in Kansas
Cities in Pottawatomie County, Kansas
Manhattan, Kansas metropolitan area